The Conquest of China by the Tartars is a 1675 tragedy by the English writer Elkanah Settle. It was originally performed by the Duke's Company at the Dorset Garden Theatre in London.

The initial cast included Thomas Gillow as Theinmingus, Henry Harris as Zungteus, Henry Norris as Palexus, Matthew Medbourne as King of China, William Smith as Quitazo, Samuel Sandford as  Lycugus, Mary Betterton as  Orunda, Elizabeth Currer as Alcinda and Mary Lee as Amavanga.

References

Bibliography
 Chang, Dongshin. Representing China on the Historical London Stage: From Orientalism to Intercultural Performance. Routledge, 2015.
 Van Lennep, W. The London Stage, 1660-1800: Volume One, 1660-1700. Southern Illinois University Press, 1960.

1675 plays
West End plays
Tragedy plays
Plays by Elkanah Settle